James Jackson (26 March 1931 – 2 March 2013) was a Scottish footballer who played mainly for Notts County.

Jackson made over 120 appearances for Notts County, scoring 50 goals, in two spells with the club. In between, he briefly played in Canada for Toronto.

References

External links

1931 births
2013 deaths
Scottish footballers
Association football forwards
Notts County F.C. players
English Football League players
Oxford United F.C. players
Footballers from Glasgow